Reegan Tanner (born 27 September 1982) is an Australian former professional rugby league footballer who played for the Newcastle Knights in the National Rugby League (NRL).

Playing career
Tanner was the only Knight to participate in every game during the 2005 season as the club finished last on the table claiming the wooden spoon.  During the 2005 season, Tanner was one of twelve players fined for breaking team curfew and engaging in acts which brought the club into disrepute.  Tanner was cut from the squad at the end of the 2007 season.

Tanner returned to his home town of Kurri Kurri where he played with the Kurri Bulldogs and was selected to represent Newcastle in the 2009 Regional Championships.

References

1982 births
Living people
Australian rugby league players
Kurri Kurri Bulldogs players
Newcastle Knights players
Rugby league locks
Rugby league players from Kurri Kurri
Rugby league second-rows